The Call of the Traumerei is a 1914 American silent short drama film directed by Jacques Jaccard and Lorimer Johnston. The film stars Charlotte Burton, Sydney Ayres, Caroline Cooke, Jack Richardson, Vivian Rich, and Harry Van Meter.

External links

1914 drama films
1914 films
Silent American drama films
American silent short films
American black-and-white films
Films directed by Jacques Jaccard
1914 short films
Films directed by Lorimer Johnston
1910s American films